Taleem-e-Balighan (lit: Education for Adults) is a 1956 Pakistani social satire TV serial which first aired on PTV in 1966. It was written by Khawaja Moinuddin. It is considered one of the classics of Pakistani television by some TV critics.

Plot and background
The story revolves around a madrassa (school) where adults are provided an education in a satirical and humorous environment. It is based on Mohammad Ali Jinnah's or Quaid-e-Azam's three principles of 'unity, faith and discipline', that became an inspiring and effective slogan for the Muslim masses during the Pakistan Movement days around 1947. This national slogan has actually become a permanent foundation stone of the 'Ideology of Pakistan' and is frequently quoted, even in 2022, by the Pakistanis as a nation. It is also quoted on TV in this drama serial in comical situations. This satire was originally written for Radio Pakistan in the 1950s before the introduction of TV broadcasts in Pakistan in November 1964. It was then adapted for PTV and first broadcast in 1966.

Cast and crew
 Mahmood Ali as 'Maulvi Sahib' or class teacher
 Qazi Wajid
 Subhani ba Yunus
 Qasim Jalali
 Razia Sultana
 Bakhtiar
 Agha Nasir (TV drama serial director)
 Khawaja Moinuddin (writer)

Reviews and discussion of drama
This TV drama serial had brought national attention to a social issue that was and still is being discussed in Pakistan.

References

External links
 Watch PTV drama serial 'Taleem-e-Balighan' on YouTube

Pakistani drama television series
Urdu-language television shows
Pakistan Television Corporation original programming
Television shows set in Karachi